Frederico Guilherme Duff Burnay de Mendonça (15 August 1888 – 10 February 1964) was a sailor from Portugal, who represented his country at the 1924 Summer Olympics in Meulan, France and at the 1928 Summer Olympics in the Zuiderzee, Netherlands.

References

Sources
 
 

Portuguese male sailors (sport)
Sailors at the 1924 Summer Olympics – Monotype
Sailors at the 1928 Summer Olympics – 6 Metre
Olympic sailors of Portugal
1888 births
1964 deaths
People from Coruche